was a temporary velodrome located in the Hachiōji, Tokyo area. Constructed between March and August 1964, it hosted the track cycling events for the 1964 Summer Olympics.  The site of the velodrome was later converted to a public park called Ryonan Park.

References
1964 Summer Olympics official report. Volume 1. Part 1. pp. 132–3.
Ryonan Park

Venues of the 1964 Summer Olympics
Hachiōji, Tokyo
Velodromes in Japan
Cycle racing in Japan
Olympic cycling venues
Sports venues in Tokyo